Eternal Love Winning Africa Hospital is a hospital in Liberia located in the capital city Monrovia. It holds 120 beds and is operated by SIM. It was established in 1965 This hospital continued its operations during the Ebola epidemic and civil wars.

See also 
 List of hospitals in Liberia
 2014 Ebola virus epidemic in Liberia

References 

Hospital buildings completed in 1965
1960s establishments in Liberia
Hospitals in Monrovia